Memories of a Murderer: The Nilsen Tapes is a British documentary film created for Netflix and directed by Michael Harte. The film details the life and murders of Scottish serial killer Dennis Nilsen, first-hand through audiotapes which were recorded from his jail cell.

References

External links 

British documentary films
2021 films
Documentary films about crime
Films about murderers
Films about murder
2021 documentary films
2020s English-language films
2020s British films